Collapsin response mediator protein 1, encoded by the CRMP1 gene, is a human protein of the CRMP family.

This gene encodes a member of a family of cytosolic phosphoproteins expressed exclusively in the nervous system. The encoded protein is thought to be a part of the semaphorin signal transduction pathway implicated in semaphorin-induced growth cone collapse during neural development. Alternative splicing results in multiple transcript variants.

CRMP1 mediates reelin signaling in cortical neuronal migration. Mice deficient in CRMP1 exhibit impaired long-term potentiation and impaired spatial learning and memory.

CRMP1 gene overlaps with another gene called EVC.

Interactions
CRMP1 has been shown to interact with DPYSL2.

References

External links

Further reading